Queen's Gate Terrace is a street in Kensington, London, in the Royal Borough of Kensington and Chelsea, home to several embassies. The street runs west to east from Gloucester Road to Queen's Gate.

C Aldin or William Harris were the architects for many of the houses.

In 1886, the politician James Bailey purchased the South Kensington Hotel, in Queen's Gate Terrace.

The Embassy of Estonia is at no 44. The UAE Embassy's Military Department is at no 6. The Embassy of France's Paymaster & Financial Comptroller Section is at no 30.

Notable people
Leonard Shoobridge (1858-1935), writer, archaeologist, poet and politician, grew up at no 40.

See also
56–58 Queen's Gate Terrace

References

External links

Streets in the Royal Borough of Kensington and Chelsea